Parotis fasciculata is a moth in the family Crambidae. It was described by Per Olof Christopher Aurivillius in 1910. It is found in Tanzania.

Holotype
The holotype of this species is illustrated on the web-pages of the 
Swedish Museum of Natural History

References

Moths described in 1910
Spilomelinae
Taxa named by Per Olof Christopher Aurivillius